Abunai  (阿布奈; 1635 – 1675), known as Prince Chahar of the First Rank (察哈尔亲王), was a Mongol prince of clan Borjigin, second son of Ligden Khan. He opposed Qing influence in his domain and was subsequently placed into house arrest in Shenyang and his son given his title. In 1675 he led the Chahar Mongols joining in the Revolt of the Three Feudatories, but were defeated in battle in April and subsequently killed.

Family 
Parents
Father: Ligden Khutugtu Khan (林丹庫圖克圖汗), Khagan of Northern Yuan dynasty
Mother: Primary consort Nangnang, of the Abaga Borjigin clan (囊囊太后 博爾濟吉特氏; d. 1674), knowns as Noble Consort Yijing
Consorts and issue:
Gurun Princess Wenzhuang, of the Aisin Gioro clan (固倫溫莊公主 爱新觉罗氏; 9 August 1625 – 1663), personal name Makata (馬喀塔)
Borni (布尔尼; 1654 – 1675 ), Prince Chahar of the First Rank (察哈尔亲王), first son
Lubuzung (罗布藏; d.1675), second son

References

Borjigin
1675 deaths
1635 births
Place of birth unknown